Zinc finger and SCAN domain-containing protein 21 is a protein that in humans is encoded by the ZSCAN21 gene.

References

Further reading